A Royal Romance may refer to:
 A Royal Romance (1930 film), an American romantic comedy film
 A Royal Romance (1917 film), a lost silent film comedy drama
 Harry & Meghan: A Royal Romance, a 2018 historical fiction television film
 Royal Romance (yacht), a luxury yacht